United States Korfball Federation, also simply known as the USKF, is the governing body for the sport of korfball in the USA. Formed in 1978, it is the association of korfball responsible for overseeing all aspects of the sport in the USA.

Korfball in the USA has had media coverage in the past and was previously an Olympic sport.

See also
United States national korfball team

References

Sports governing bodies in the United States
Korfball in the United States
Korfball governing bodies
1978 establishments in the United States
Sports organizations established in 1978